The Australian women's cricket team toured England and Ireland in 2015. The matches against England were played for the Women's Ashes, which since 2013 consists of a multi-format series with points awarded for each of the matches. Two points were awarded for each Twenty20 International (T20I) or One Day International (ODI) win, and four points to the Test winner (compared with six in the previous series) or two points to each team in the event of a Test draw.

The Women's Ashes were held by England before the series but, after winning two ODIs, the Test match and the second T20I, Australia regained the Ashes on 28 August 2015 with one T20I match to play. It was also the first time Australia had won the Ashes in England since 2001, after a draw in 2009 and defeats in the 2005 and 2013 series.

Australia won the ODI match series (2–1) and the sole Test match. England won the T20I match series (2–1).  Overall Australia won the Ashes (10 points to 6). Australia's Ellyse Perry scored 264 runs, took 16 wickets and was named the player of the series.

The ODI matches were also part of the 2014–16 ICC Women's Championship.

Apart from their games in England, Australia also defeated Ireland 3–0 in a T20I series played in Dublin.

The Women's Ashes

Squads

1 Delissa Kimmince was Replaced in the T20I squad by Grace Harris as she was unable to recover from a lower back issue.

ODI series

1st ODI

2nd ODI

3rd ODI

Test series

Only Test

T20I series

1st T20I

2nd T20I

3rd T20I

Results

*Match was originally scheduled on 26 July but due to rain was abandoned and moved to the reserve day (27 July).

Statistics

Batting
Most runs

Bowling
Most wickets

Ireland

A scheduled break between the Test and Twenty20 International (T20I) matches against England during the Women's Ashes allowed Australia to travel and play a three T20I match series against Ireland between 19 and 22 August. Australia won all three matches and the series with Grace Harris being named player of the series.

Squads

T20I series

1st T20I

2nd T20I

3rd T20I

Statistics

Batting
Most runs

Bowling
Most wickets

References

Further reading

External links
 Series home at ESPN Cricinfo

The Women's Ashes
2014–16 ICC Women's Championship
International cricket competitions in 2015
2015 in English women's cricket
2015–16 Australian women's cricket season
2015 in Irish cricket
England 2015
Australia 2015
Australia 2015
cricket
July 2015 sports events in Europe
August 2015 sports events in Europe
2015 in women's cricket